Yes We Can may refer to:

Politics
"Yes We Can" (slogan), a slogan used by the 2008 Barack Obama presidential campaign
"Obama (Yes We Can)", a 2008 campaign song by Andy Fraser

Music
Yes We Can, a 1970 album by Lee Dorsey
Yes We Can (album), a 2010 album by World Saxophone Quartet
"Yes We Can" (Lee Dorsey song), 1970 song written by Allen Toussaint
"Yes We Can" (Made in Mexico song), 2008
"Yes We Can" (will.i.am song), 2008
"Yes We Can", a 2014 song by Oscar Zia

Television
 Yes We Can! (TV series), a Singaporean TV series
 "Yes we can!", a refrain by characters on Bob the Builder

See also
Catalonia Yes we Can, a left-wing coalition in the 2015 Catalonia elections
Sí se puede ("Yes, you can" or "Yes, it can" in English), the motto of United Farm Workers 
Yes I Can (disambiguation)
"Yes We Can Can", a 1973 song written by Allen Toussaint
 "Yes We Can Win the Best for Scotland", the Scottish National Party's 1997 United Kingdom general election manifesto
 We Can Do It (disambiguation)